Charterhouse is a public school (English boarding school for pupils aged 13–18) in Godalming, Surrey, England. Originally founded by Thomas Sutton in 1611 on the site of the old Carthusian monastery in Charterhouse Square, Smithfield, London, it educates over 800 pupils, aged 13 to 18 years. Charterhouse is one of the 'great' nine English public schools reported upon by the Clarendon Commission in 1864 and is a member of the Rugby Group schools.

Charterhouse charges full boarders up to £44,220 per annum (2022/2023) and is among the most expensive Headmasters' and Headmistresses' Conference (HMC) schools in the UK. It educated the British Prime Minister Lord Liverpool and has a long list of notable alumni.

SR V class 4-4-0 no. E903 (later no. 903 and 30903) was named Charterhouse after the school.

History 

In May 1611, the London Charterhouse came into the hands of Thomas Sutton (1532–1611) of Knaith, Lincolnshire. He acquired a fortune by the discovery of coal on two estates which he had leased near Newcastle-on-Tyne, and afterwards, removing to London, he carried on a commercial career. In 1611, the year of his death, he endowed a hospital on the site of the Charterhouse, calling it the hospital of King James, and in his will he bequeathed moneys to maintain a chapel, hospital (almshouse) and school. He died on 12 December, and subsequently the will was hotly contested but upheld in court, and the foundation was finally constituted to afford a home for eighty male pensioners (gentlemen by descent and in poverty, soldiers that have borne arms by sea or land, merchants decayed by piracy or shipwreck, or servants in household to the King or Queen), and to educate forty boys.

Charterhouse established a reputation for excellence in hospital care and treatment, thanks in part to Henry Levett, an Oxford graduate who joined the school as a physician in 1712. Levett was widely esteemed for his medical writings, including an early tract on the treatment of smallpox. Levett was buried in Charterhouse Chapel and his widow married Andrew Tooke, the headmaster of Charterhouse.

The school was moved to its present site in 1872 by the then headmaster, William Haig Brown – a decision influenced by the findings of the Clarendon Commission of 1864.

The school bought a  site atop a hill just outside Godalming. In addition to the main school buildings (designed by architect Philip Charles Hardwick), they constructed three boarding houses, known as Saunderites (once the headmaster's house, pronounced "sarnderites" rather than "sornderites"), Verites and Gownboys (for scholars, who were entitled to wear gowns). The school was built by Lucas Brothers, who also built the Royal Albert Hall and Covent Garden.

As pupil numbers grew, other houses were built alongside the approach road, now known as Charterhouse Hill. Each was titled with an adaptation of the name of their first housemaster, such as Weekites, Daviesites and Girdlestoneites. The last of these is still referred to as Duckites, reflecting the unusual gait of its original housemaster, even though he retired well over 100 years ago. There are now the original four 'old' houses plus ten 'new' houses (currently three girls' houses), making fourteen boarding houses in total. The fourteen Houses have preserved a unique identity (each with its own tie and colours) and pupils compete against each other in both sports and the arts. Two new boarding houses were opened upon their completion ahead of the start of the 21/22 academic year. This was done by former pupil and sitting MP Jeremy Hunt. This made the total number of houses reach fifteen.

The school continued to expand over the 20th century. Around 350 names have been subsequently added to commemorate those who died in the Second World War and other more recent conflicts.

An addition to the campus was seven new Houses, built in the 1970s, replacing late Victorian boarding houses which were demolished in 1977. Other newer buildings include the Art Studio, the John Derry Technology Centre, the Ben Travers Theatre, the Ralph Vaughan Williams Music Centre, the Halford Hewitt Golf Course, the Queen's Sports Centre, the Sir Greville Spratt athletics track and Chetwynd, a hall of residence for girls. In 2003, the School renovated its onsite Library. 2006 saw the opening of The Beveridge Centre for the Social Sciences. In 2007, a £3m Modern Languages building was completed.

The school has a top 60 placing in the A level league tables, and in 2011 over 80% of pupils are awarded an A* or A grade at GCSE. In 2009, the school announced its decision to switch from A Levels to the International Baccalaureate and Cambridge Pre-U. In 2012 Charterhouse had its best set of Cambridge Pre-U results with 96% of examinations taken awarded Distinction or Merit grades. Seventy-eight pupils achieved Distinctions (or their A level equivalent) in all subjects taken and twenty-one achieved the equivalent of A level A* grades in all their subjects. Twenty pupils were offered places at Oxford or Cambridge.

In 2007, Roy Hattersley, former Deputy Leader of the Labour Party and minister, reported on a visit to Charterhouse in the Guardian newspaper. After describing his impression that "[The chapel]'s geometric spires and minarets proclaim complete confidence that Charterhouse educates men who are destined to rule the universe", he said: "Academically and pastorally, it is near to beyond criticism. And after only a brief glimpse of the school, I have no doubt that I would have been ecstatically happy there. But its existence allows the rich and the powerful to ignore the world beyond its boundaries." He therefore concluded that his aspiration to abolish private education in the 1970s was "totally justified".

The 2009 Ofsted Social Care Inspection Report noted that 'The provision for "Helping children achieve well and enjoy what they do" is rated as outstanding.' and 'This is a good school, in which boarders' welfare is promoted by a strong approach to countering bullying and child protection. Boarding staff have good relationships with the boarders, and boarders can list a range of people who they can talk to if they are worried or have concerns.'

The 2011 Independent Schools Inspectorate Report noted that 'The quality of pupils' achievements is excellent. Pupils are extremely well educated. They attain extremely high standards in external examinations and make exceptional progress in their learning because of their positive attitudes to study, dedicated and often inspiring teaching, and an academically challenging curriculum that is adapted to suit all needs. The curriculum is enriched by an outstanding range of activities'.

The 2017 ISI Educational Quality Inspection Report noted that ‘Pupils' academic and other achievements are high and often exceptional. Pupils' successes in external competitions, in academic distinctions and in sport, music and the creative and aesthetic arts are exceptional. Pupils' social development is outstanding. Pupils are polite, courteous and respectful of one another and of the adults who care for them. Relationships between pupils and staff are excellent. Pupils mature into independent and self-motivated pupils over the course of their time at school and are extremely well prepared, not only for the next stage of their lives, but also to contribute to society at large.’

Charterhouse originally accepted boys only. The school began accepting girls in sixth form in 1971. In 2017 the school announced that it is moving to full co-education from the age of 13, and will welcome the first girls into Year 9 in September 2021. There will be girls in every year group from September 2023.

School terms 
There are three academic terms (known as Quarters) in the year,
 The Oration Quarter (OQ), from early September to mid December.
 The Long Quarter (LQ), from mid January to late March. Therefore, it traditionally had the distinction of being the shortest third of the school year, despite its name.
 The Cricket Quarter (CQ), from late April to late June or early July.

Houses 

There are four old boarding houses and eleven new houses in the White Book (a directory of names) order. In Charterhouse vocabulary an old house is one which was founded in the early years of the school, as opposed to the new houses which were created later and are situated away from the main school. They are all distinguished by the colour of the pupils' ties, umbrellas and football team's stripes.

In Autumn 2010, a new house was opened for sixth-form pupils, called Fletcherites, named after Frank Fletcher, a former headmaster. The house moved into the old Great Comp building, now renovated.
Verites, Saunderites and Gownboys houses predate the move to Godalming in 1872 and are known as the "old" houses. However, Girdlestoneites is now treated as one of the "old houses" because it, along with Verites, Saunderites and Gownboys, are the only houses still in their 1870s buildings, while all the rest are in their 1970s replacements. Technically the "old" houses plus Girdlestoneites are known as "block" houses, due to their location in the main 1870s block of buildings. Saunderites is named after its first Housemaster Dr. Saunders (Headmaster 1832–53) and it was the Headmaster's house, in that the headmaster would not only run the school but one of the houses. Gownboys was named not after their original housemaster, but because it was the scholars' house, although scholars were distributed across all the houses after the transfer to Godalming. As was tradition, scholars wore gowns with their uniform and were treated as superior to other boys. There is no longer such a tradition and the scholars are now distributed throughout the various houses, on a random but numerically equal basis. There are still scholars in Gownboys, but in no greater proportion than any other house.

Verites is a contraction of Oliverites (Oliver Walford, School Usher 1838–55) and hence 'Verites' is pronounced as if the 'Ver' is from Oliver not as from 'very'. The records of the house run back to the start of the last century, but previously it was just called 'Boarders House No.2'.

Uskites was a temporary house opened in 1872 by Mr Stewart, the writing and chemistry instructor from the old Charterhouse. It was closed in 1878 and the pupils redistributed. The building itself (on Peperharow Road) was bought by a schoolmaster, and later used by the School as a sanatorium. It is now masters' accommodation.

All new Houses apart from Bodeites are named after their founders (although Robinites was originally Robinsonites). Bodeites was originally Buissonites, named after the Head of Languages at the time. He ran off with the matron, and so the house was renamed Bodeites after the replacement, Mr Bode.

Charterhouse has traditionally had very few day pupils. In the 1870s the statutes of the school limited them to 10 (excluding sons of masters) and in the late 1980s the number was only around 25 (some of whom were the sons of masters). Now however, there are spaces for two day pupils in each House per year group, giving a total of 10 day pupils in each House (totaling 150 day pupils across the whole School). In the same way as those boarding, a day pupil also becomes a member of one of the Houses.

To keep up with the increasing number of female applicants to the school, Charterhouse began transitioning former boys' houses Weekites and Girdlestoneites into girl only houses. Weekites became coeducational at the start of OQ 2022 with 36 girls joining in Year 9, Year 10 and Lower Sixth. Girdlestoneites is set to do the same in OQ 2023. Both will be fully transitioned into girls' houses by September 2025 and 2026 respectively.

Memorial Chapel 

Memorial Chapel, designed by Sir Giles Gilbert Scott and consecrated in 1927, commemorates the Carthusians who died in action: 700 in World War I and 350 in World War II.

Attendance at all chapel services is compulsory, except where individual exemptions are granted on religious grounds.

Chapel provides a variety of worship experience: hymn-singing; Psalm chanting; the choir performs a repertoire of Church Music; Candle-lit Carols; Eucharists in Millennium Chapel; Remembrance Sunday with the sounding of The Last Post and The Silence.

Each year there is a confirmation service in late January and pupils from any year group can be prepared for this.

The school retains the old chapel used by the school prior to 1927. However, when the school first moved to Godalming even this was not built, and the pupils walked the 2 miles to Shackleford Church. Pupils subsequently benefited, because the time taken for the walk precluded the continuance of Sunday school, which ran from 10:00 to 10:30 on Sundays, which has remained a non-teaching day ever since.

Uniform 

 Under School

The Under School consists of the first three years of attendance at Charterhouse, being the Fourth Form, the Removes and the Fifth Form (GCSE year). Pupils in Under School wear a weekday uniform consisting of a white or blue shirt, house tie, grey trousers, optional blue or black jumper or sweater-vest, dark grey jacket and black leather shoes. A waistcoat is optional. Variations include various society and school honours' ties.

Transition from the Under School to the Upper School occurs upon successful completion of the GCSE exams.

 Specialists ('The Upper School')
The Specialists (Lower and Upper Sixth Forms) constitute the last two years of attendance at Charterhouse, and form the Upper School. Having completed the GCSE exams successfully, 'First & Second Year Specialists' (as they are colloquially referred) spend two years studying for their A-Level or Pre-U examinations, usually in three subjects, although some students will read for four, or their IB exams. The grey jacket is replaced by a grey blazer with pink squares and shirts may be pink or of striped patterns.

Whether in Under or Upper School, any pupil who has been awarded his House or School 'Colours' for sport or culture, may wear his 'Colours' tie in place of his house tie. School monitors may also wear their monitor tie instead of a house tie, if they so choose. For further on this, please see below, under "School Honours".

 Summer dresses
During Cricket Quarter, the school uniform can vary slightly from that of the two preceding terms. Boys may wear cravats in house colours instead of ties and are permitted to wear straw Boaters similar to the 'Harrow Hat' found at Harrow School, but these are almost never worn by the majority of pupils. Boys in the Under School may also wear navy blazers similar to those worn by the Specialists. As well as these variations, boys may roll up their sleeves in hashes unless asked not to by a beak.

Members of the 1st XI Cricket Team have their own variation on summer dress which is described later in the article.
 School Honours
School Honours is the Colours system rewarding pupils in various fields with variations on school dress. They are as follows:

House colours – House colours are a variation on the house tie. Colours awarded for house sport prowess have thicker stripes in the House colour, whereas those awarded for cultural prowess have thin doubled striped.

School colours – School colours are awarded for services to School sport, culture and other areas deemed worthy. They all have a similar design of a solid colour and are covered in the crest of Thomas Sutton, the school's founder. However, they come in varying colours:
The Head of School – The Heads of School (head boy and deputy, as well as the head girl and deputy head girl) is permitted to wear a Pink tie adorned with Sutton Crests.
1st XI Major Sports – Members of the 1st Team in major school sports (football, hockey and cricket) are permitted to wear maroon ties.
Minor Sports – Holders of colours in Minor Sports are permitted to wear a silver ties.
Academic/Scholars – Holders of Academic or Scholars colours are permitted to wear a green tie.
Culture – Those deemed worthy enough in cultural fields are permitted to wear a purple tie.
Service – Brown ties are awarded for commendable service to the school community. Most frequently they are awarded by the CCF.

1st XI Cricket – Members of the 1st XI Cricket team are permitted to wear pink blazers with Sutton's Crest on the front pocket to Hashes on match days (usually Saturdays).

Greyhounds – Every year a few Carthusians are given Greyhound awards for outstanding service to the school. Those awarded the prize are permitted to wear a navy blue tie with rampant gold greyhounds, the greyhound being a notable feature of the coat of arms of Thomas Sutton.

Academic – Pupils who have gained distinctive academic achievements are awarded the Academic Tie and may be referred to as Scholars of the school. They are permitted to wear a green tie adorned with the Sutton Crest.

Culture – Pupils who have contributed to the school distinctively in terms of culture (music, drama etc.) are awarded the Culture Tie, which has a deep purple colour with the Sutton Crest.

Events 

Carthusian Day is the main social event of the school calendar. It is held on day preceding the Exeat in CQ and Sunday dress is worn. The day is intended for the parents and families of Carthusians to visit the school. Speeches are made and Sports events played: including the annual Cricket and Golf matches between Carthusians and Old Carthusians.

Founder's Day is celebrated every year to commemorate the founding of the school and to thank the founder and benefactor Thomas Sutton. It is considered one of the most important days of the year and is held on the last day of OQ. The day consists of 'clearing up' in houses before 'Founders Feast', a large feast for the whole school where Black Tie is worn. The feast is followed by games and activities.

St. Andrew's Day is celebrated by an annual ball hosted by the historical 'Scottish Dancing society. On St. Andrews Day pupils are permitted to wear traditional Scottish dress including a Kilt, Ghillies and a Sporran.

'The 50 Mile Walk' is an annual event for the 1st Year specialists held at the end of CQ. It consists of walking a  stretch from Brighton to the Brooke Hall arch and taking regular Hashes the next day. The March originates from the 1950s when the American Navy SEALs challenged the School, saying that only they could walk  and go to work the next day. Those who complete the walk in less than 24 Hours are awarded a special '50' tie, which until 2006 consisted of a navy blue tie with the school crest that has a '50' written below it. The current tie is a thickly striped affair in Pink (for the school), Green (for the countryside) and Blue (for the night)

Monitors 
Monitors are chosen pupils who are deemed to have the best qualities in leadership and achievement. Each house has at least one monitor, who is appointed Head of House (the most senior pupil in house). On a school-wide level one monitor is appointed the Head of School, and a deputy is appointed to assist. Monitors may wear Navy blue ties and Navy scarves with an embroidered crest. Monitors are also permitted to ride bikes to and from hashes (Carthusian term for lessons) as well as out of Hash time.

House Apostles 
The Headmaster's Essay Society, also known as the 'House Apostles' is a historical society of twelve Carthusians deemed to be the most intellectual in the school. The students are invited by the Headmaster to present papers on chosen subjects on Monday evenings and meetings are held in the Headmaster's House. All members are allowed to wear Cambridge Blue Academic ties or scarfs.

Sports 

The former England batsman and captain Peter May was educated at Charterhouse. Martin Bicknell, the former Surrey and England seam bowler joined the school as head of cricket following his retirement from the sport in 2006.

In 1999–2000, the Charterhouse first XI reached the final of the ISFA Cup, after winning all their previous rounds away from home, but were beaten 0–1 in the final at the Leicester City ground by Shrewsbury. The school first XI of the year 2006–7 again reached the ISFA cup final, losing on penalties after a one-all draw with Hampton. One year later, the school first XI again qualified for the ISFA cup final against Millfield. Because of poor weather conditions, it was decided that the match would be played on one of Charterhouse's pitches instead of the usual Walkers Stadium or the replacement at Woking F.C. stadium. The team won this match on penalties. In March 2011, the school reached another ISFA final, a fixture with Eton after knocking out Repton and Millfield in the quarter and semi-final respectively. They ran out 2–0 winners on the day.

Origins of football 
Association Football is the main Winter sport at the school. During the 1840s at both Charterhouse and Westminster School pupils' surroundings meant they were confined to playing their football in the cloisters, making the rough and tumble of the handling game that was developing at other schools such as Rugby impossible, and necessitating a new code of rules. Dingley Dell, the most active non-school team in the London area in the five years before the Football Association was established in 1863, played Charterhouse eight times between February 1860 and February 1863. During the formulation of the rules of the Association Football in the 1860s representatives of Charterhouse and Westminster School pushed for a passing game, in particular rules that allowed forward passing ("passing on"). Other schools (in particular Eton College, Shrewsbury School and Harrow) favoured a dribbling game with a tight off-side rule. It is claimed that Stoke Ramblers was formed in 1863 when former pupils of Charterhouse School formed a football club while apprentices at the North Staffordshire Railway works in Stoke-on-Trent. By 1867 the Football Association had chosen in favour of the Charterhouse and Westminster game and adopted a "loose" off-side rule that permitted forward passing. The modern forward-passing game was a direct consequence of Charterhouse and Westminster football.

In the early years of the FA Cup, teams formed of ex-pupils from these schools dominated the competition. The Old Carthusians F.C. (the name for the team composed of Charterhouse alumni) won the cup in the 1880–81 season, beating the Old Etonians in the final, and were semi-finalists in the two years that followed. The public school system also provided many of the first England internationals. They included Charles Wreford-Brown, who is often credited for inventing the word "soccer". He was a pupil at Charterhouse in the early 1880s, and played football for the Old Carthusians and for the national side in the 1890s, including several appearances as captain.

Published in 2008, From Cloister to Cup Finals chronicles this history. It was written by Malcolm Bailey, an old Cambridge Blue, and former teacher, housemaster and head of Football at Charterhouse.

Cricket ground
The first recorded match on the school cricket ground came in 1859, when the school played Marlborough College. From its inception, the school has used the ground to take on a number of colleges in England. The cricket ground has held a single List-A match, which was played between Surrey and Warwickshire in the 1972 John Player League. Starting in 2006, the ground has held a number of Surrey Second XI fixtures in the Second XI Championship and Second XI Trophy.

Herbarium
The School's Herbarium carries the Index Herbariorum designation GOD and is maintained as The Charterhouse School Herbarium in the University and Jepson Herbaria, University of California, Berkeley.

The scope of the collections is mainly the British Isles, although some plants are from Europe, South Africa and eastern North America. The principal collectors were James Edward Moxon, Rev. George Brown Moxon, Rev. Tullie Cornthwaite, Rev. Samuel Titmas (first curator of Charterhouse Museum), Frederick Yorke Brocas, Andrew Bloxam, William Gardiner, James Buckman and John Drew Salmon. The collections are currently being digitised and being released by the Botanical Society of Britain and Ireland, on the herbaria@home website.

Carthusian language 
Known as Lingua Carthusiana, the terminology of this language or idiolect has evolved over the centuries of Charterhouse's existence and is used within the Charterhouse community on a daily basis.

Fees 
In any given year, there is some contention about which is the most expensive public school in England, depending on whether one compares day fees or boarding fees. In 2019, Charterhouse was reported to be among the most expensive schools for boarding pupils. Charging up to £11,415 per term in 2014/15, Charterhouse is the 7th most expensive HMC boarding school in the UK. For the 2022/23 academic year, day boarding fees are £36,540 and boarding is £44,220.

Controversy

School fees cartel (2005) 

In November 2005, the school was one of fifty of the country's leading independent schools which were found guilty of running an illegal price-fixing cartel, exposed by The Times newspaper, although the schools made clear that they had not realised that the change to the law (which had happened only a few months earlier) about the sharing of information had subsequently made it an offence. Each school was required to pay a nominal penalty of £10,000 and all agreed to make ex-gratia payments totalling three million pounds into a trust designed to benefit pupils who attended the schools during the period in respect of which fee information was shared. Mrs Jean Scott, the head of the Independent Schools Council, said that independent schools had always been exempt from anti-cartel rules applied to business, were following a long-established procedure in sharing the information with each other, and that they were unaware of the change to the law (on which they had not been consulted). She wrote to John Vickers, the director-general of the Office of Fair Trading saying: "They are not a group of businessmen meeting behind closed doors to fix the price of their products to the disadvantage of the consumer. They are schools that have quite openly continued to follow a long-established practice because they were unaware that the law had changed."

Gary Lineker accusations (2010) 

In August 2010, former English footballer Gary Lineker publicly accused Charterhouse of failing his son, George, in his bid for a place at university. Lineker claimed that the school had used him as a 'guinea pig' by ditching A-Levels for the new Cambridge Pre-U. The school reacted by saying it was proud of its students' results. John Witheridge, then headmaster, defended the choice of the Pre-U as being more academically rigorous and educationally valid than the current A-Level standard in an article in The Spectator in August 2010.

Historic sexual abuse 
In March 2012, it was reported that a 16-year-old had filmed fellow pupils while they showered, and stored the images on his laptop. The boy was taken into custody by Surrey Police for questioning. A police inquiry was subsequently established.

In April 2013, a physics teacher, Dean Johnson, resigned after allegations of an 'inappropriate relationship' with a former teenage girl pupil led to a police investigation. A police investigation followed, and resulted in a conviction after trial by a jury for the teacher who was found to be in possession of extreme pornography, which depicted a woman being hanged, in 2015; he was given an eight-month prison sentence, suspended for two years. A professional misconduct panel later found:

 that he had sex with her in the classroom at the school;
 that he had communicated his fantasies to the girl over Facebook;
 that he had asked what her underwear size was before buying stockings and presenting them to her gift-wrapped;
 that the relationship became sexual weeks after the girl turned 18.

In 2018, Cathy Newman, who attended the school on a scholarship said that she was humiliated and sexually harassed while a pupil at the school. Other ex-pupils told The Times about experiences including a humiliating initiation ceremony at the school and flashing and groping incidents. Rebecca Willis, commenting on similar themes around the time reiterated these themes, but also commented on racism which resulted in Asian children leaving. The school has subsequently contacted former pupils to ask them to share concerns.

Film location 
The school is occasionally used as a film location. It was used to represent the Palace of Westminster in the 2018 BBC drama Bodyguard and in seasons 4 and 5 of Netflix's The Crown where the Memorial Chapel and South African Cloisters are made to represent the House of Commons. In addition, a location outside of Brooke Hall was used in the filming of The Crown season 5. It has previously been used in The Boys are Back, Jupiter Ascending, St Trinians 2, The Mystery of Edwin Drood (an adaptation of a Charles Dickens novel), Foyle's War, An Ideal Husband, and Vampire Academy.

Headmasters

Old Carthusians 

Former pupils are referred to as Old Carthusians, and current pupils as Carthusians.

Victoria Cross holders 
Three Old Carthusians have won the Victoria Cross:
Victoria Cross
Hunza-Nagar Expedition, India
Lieutenant Guy Hudleston Boisragon (at Charterhouse from Oration Quarter (OQ) (Autumn Term) 1878 to OQ 1880). He later achieved the rank of brigadier. (1864–1931)
Mohmand Campaign, Bilot, India
Lieutenant James Morris Colquhoun Colvin (at Charterhouse from Cricket Quarter (CQ) (Summer Term) 1884 to CQ 1888). He later achieved the rank of colonel. (1870–1945)
First World War
Lieutenant Eric Archibald McNair (at Charterhouse from CQ 1907 to CQ 1913 – was Head of the School). He later achieved the rank of captain. (1894–1918)

See also
List of English and Welsh endowed schools (19th century)

References

External links 
Charterhouse School website

Boys' schools in Surrey
Private schools in Surrey
Member schools of the Headmasters' and Headmistresses' Conference
Boarding schools in Surrey
International Baccalaureate schools in England
Racquets venues
Educational institutions established in the 1610s
1611 establishments in England
School buildings completed in 1872
Relocated schools
Cricket grounds in Surrey
Godalming
Surrey County Cricket Club grounds
Church of England private schools in the Diocese of Guildford
Sports venues completed in 1859
Schools cricket